Jaume Bosch i Mestres or Jaume Bosch (born 1953) is a Spanish politician from Catalonia. He earned a law degree from the University of Barcelona where he later taught. He was an aid to the mayor of Sant Feliu de Llobregat from 1991 to 1999. He later served as deputy and senator in the Cortes Generales.

References

1953 births
Living people
Members of the 7th Senate of Spain
Members of the 8th Senate of Spain
Politicians from Barcelona
University of Barcelona alumni